'Flora Alejandra Pizarnik (29 April 1936 – 25 September 1972) was an Argentine poet. Her idiosyncratic and thematically introspective poetry has been considered "one of the most unusual bodies of work in Latin American literature", and has been recognized and celebrated for its fixation on "the limitation of language, silence, the body, night, the nature of intimacy, madness, [and] death".

Pizarnik studied philosophy at the Universidad de Buenos Aires and worked as a writer and a literary critic for several publishers and magazines. She lived in Paris between 1960 and 1964, where she translated authors such as Antonin Artaud, Henri Michaux, Aimé Cesairé and Yves Bonnefoy. She also studied history of religion and French literature in La Sorbonne. Back in Buenos Aires, Pizarnik published three of her major works: Los trabajos y las noches, Extracción de la piedra de locura and El infierno musical as well as a prose work titled, La condesa sangrienta. In 1969 she received a Guggenheim Fellowship and later, in 1971, a Fulbright Fellowship.

On September 25, 1972, she died by suicide after ingesting an overdose of secobarbital. Her work has influenced generations of authors in Latin America.

Biography
Early life
Flora Alejandra Pizarnik was born on April 29, 1936, in Avellaneda, a city within the Greater Buenos Aires metropolitan area, Argentina, to Jewish immigrant parents from Rovno (now Ukraine).Biografía literaria Her parents were Elías Pizarnik (Pozharnik) and Rejzla Bromiker. She had a difficult childhood, struggling with acne and self-esteem issues, as well as having a stutter. She adopted the name Alejandra as a teenager. As an adult, she had a clinical diagnosis of schizophrenia.

Career
A year after entering the department of philosophy and letters at the Universidad de Buenos Aires, Pizarnik published her first book of poetry, La tierra más ajena (1955). She took courses in literature, journalism, and philosophy at the university of Buenos Aires Faculty of Philosophy and Letters, but dropped out in order to pursue painting with Juan Batlle Planas. Pizarnik followed her debut work with two more volumes of poems, La última inocencia (1956) and Las aventuras perdidas (1958). She was an avid reader of fiction and poetry. Beginning with novels, she delved into more literature with similar topics to learn from different points of view. This sparked an interest early on for literature and also for the unconscious, which in turn gave rise to her interest in psychoanalysis. Pizarnik’s involvement in Surrealist methods of expression was represented by her automatic writing techniques.

Her lyricism was influenced by Antonio Porchia, French symbolists—especially Arthur Rimbaud and Stéphane Mallarmé—, the spirit of romanticism and by the surrealists. She wrote prose poems, in the spirit of Octavio Paz, but from a woman's perspective on issues ranging from loneliness, childhood, and death. Pizarnik was bisexual/lesbian but in much of her work references to relationships with women were self-censored due to the oppressive nature of the Argentinian dictatorship she lived under.

Between 1960 and 1964 Pizarnik lived in Paris, where she worked for the magazine Cuadernos and other French editorials. She published poems and criticism in many newspapers, translated Antonin Artaud, Henri Michaux, Aimé Césaire, Yves Bonnefoy and Marguerite Duras. She also studied French religious history and literature at the Sorbonne. There she became friends with Julio Cortázar, Rosa Chacel, Silvina Ocampo and Octavio Paz. Paz even wrote the prologue for her fourth poetry book, The Tree of Diana (1962). A famous sequence on Diana reads: "I jumped from myself to dawn/I left my body next to the light/and sang the sadness of being born." She returned to Buenos Aires in 1964, and published her best-known books of poetry: Los trabajos y las noches (1965), Extracción de la piedra de la locura (1968) and El infierno musical (1971). She was awarded a Guggenheim Fellowship in 1968, and in 1971 a Fulbright Scholarship.

 Death 
Pizarnik died by suicide on September 25, 1972, by overdosing on secobarbital, at the age of 36, on the same weekend she left the hospital where she was institutionalized. She is buried at the Cementerio Israelita in La Tablada, Buenos Aires Province.

BooksThe Most Foreign Country (La tierra más ajena) (1955)
translated by Yvette Siegert (Ugly Duckling Presse, October 2015)The Final Innocence (La última inocencia) (1956)
translated by Yvette Siegert (Ugly Duckling Presse, October 2016)The Lost Adventures (Las aventuras perdidas) (1958)Diana's Tree (Árbol de Diana) (1962)
translated by Yvette Siegert (Ugly Duckling Presse, October 2014); translated by Anna Deeny Morales (Shearsman Books, 2020)Works and Nights (Los trabajos y las noches) (1965)
translated by Yvette Siegert (in Extracting the Stone of Madness: Poems 1962-1972, New Directions, September 2015)Extracting the Stone of Madness (Extracción de la piedra de locura) (1968)
translated by Yvette Siegert (in Extracting the Stone of Madness: Poems 1962-1972, New Directions, September 2015)A Musical Hell (El infierno musical) (1971)
translated by Yvette Siegert (New Directions, July 2013; reprinted in Extracting the Stone of Madness: Poems 1962-1972 by New Directions, September 2015)The Bloody Countess (La condesa sangrienta) '''(1971)Exchanging Lives: Poems and Translations, Translator Susan Bassnett, Peepal Tree, 2002. 

Further reading

Giannini, Natalia Rita. Pro(bl)em: The paradox of genre in the literary renovation of the Spanish American poema en prosa (on the prose poetry of Alejandra Pizarnik and Giannina Braschi). Diss. Florida Atlantic U. (1998)These are Not Sweet Girls featuring Alejandra Pizarnik, Giannina Braschi, Marjorie Agosin, and Julia Alvarez," White Pine Press, 2000. .
"La Disolucion En La Obra de Alejandra Pizarnik: Ensombrecimiento de La Existencia y Ocultamiento del Ser,"  by Ana Maria Rodriguez Francia, 2003. .
"Unmothered Americas: Poetry and universality, Charles Simic, Alejandra Pizarnik, Giannina Braschi", Jaime Rodriguez Matos, dissertation, Columbia University; Faculty Advisor: Gustavo Perez-Firmat, 2005.
“The Sadean Poetics of Solitude in Paz and Pizarnik.” Latin American Literary Review / Rolando Pérez, 2005
Review: Art & Literature of the Americas: The 40th anniversary Edition", featuring Alejandra Pizarnik, Christina Peri Rossi, Octavio Paz, Giannina Braschi," edited by Doris Sommer and Tess O'Dwyer, 2006.
"Arbol de Alejandra: Pizarnik Reassessed," (monograph) by Karl Posso and Fiona J. Mackintosh, 2007.Alejandra, special issue of Point of Contact, edited by Ivonne Bordelois and Pedro Cuperman, vol. 10, no. 1-2, 2010. .
"Cornerstone," from A Musical Hell, Alejandra Pizarnik, trans. Yvette Siegert, in Guernica: A Journal of Literature and Art (online; April 15, 2013).
Chávez-Silverman, Susana. “Trac(k)ing Gender and Sexuality in the Writing of Alejandra Pizarnik.” Chasqui: revista de literatura latinoamericana, vol. 35, no. 2, 2006, pp. 89–108.
Chávez-Silverman, Susana. “Alejandra Pizarnik.” Who’s Who in Contemporary Gay and Lesbian History: From World War II to the Present Day, edited by Robert Aldrich and Gary Wotherspoon, Routledge, 2001, pp. 331–33.
Chávez-Silverman, Susana. “The Autobiographical as Horror in the Poetry of Alejandra Pizarnik.” Critical Studies onn the Feminist Subject in the Americas, edited by Giovanna Covi, 1997, pp. 1–17.
Chávez-Silverman, Susana. “The Look that Kills: The ‘Unacceptable Beauty’ of Alejandra Pizarnik’s La condesa sangrienta,” Entiendes?: Queer Readings, Hispanic Writings, edited by Emilie L. Bergmann and Paul Julian Smith, Duke University Press, 1995, pp 281-305
Chávez-Silverman, Susana. “The Discourse of Madness in the Poetry of Alejandra Pizarnik.” Monographic Review/Revista Monográfica,'' no. 6, 1991, 274-81.

See also
Argentine literature
Latin American literature
Prose poetry
Latin American poetry

References

External links

ODP Directory of Pizarnik's sites (English)
CVC.Alejandra Pizarnik (Spanish)
Alejandra Pizarnik (English)

1936 births
1972 deaths
1972 suicides
20th-century Argentine Jews
20th-century Argentine poets
20th-century diarists
20th-century Argentine LGBT people
20th-century translators
20th-century Argentine women writers
Argentine diarists
Argentine Jews
Lesbian poets
Argentine people of Russian-Jewish descent
Argentine people of Slovak-Jewish descent
Argentine translators
Argentine women poets
Drug-related suicides in Argentina
Jewish Argentine writers
Jewish poets
LGBT Jews
Argentine LGBT poets
People from Buenos Aires
Poètes maudits
Postmodern writers
University of Buenos Aires alumni
University of Paris alumni